KRKY (930 AM) is a radio station  broadcasting a country music format. Licensed to Granby, Colorado, United States, the station is currently owned by Patricia MacDonald Garber and Peter Benedetti, through licensee AlwaysMountainTime, LLC.

FM Translator
The programming for Ski Country FM originates with KRKY 930 AM; an FM translator is not allowed to operate independently.  In this case the translator frequency is used in the logo and branding of the station.

History
The station was assigned the call letters KRDZ on 1984-08-13. On 1986-05-21, the station changed its call sign to KTLD and on 1988-03-16 to the current KRKY.

References

External links

Country radio stations in the United States
RKY